Negwegon State Park is an undeveloped public recreation area on Lake Huron lying  southeast of the unincorporated community of Ossineke in Alpena County and Alcona County, Michigan. The park includes lowland areas with small ridges, mature pine forest, open meadows, and a long sand beach. It is administered by the Michigan Department of Natural Resources with support from the volunteer "Friends of Negwegon."

History
First purchase of land for the park, then known as Alpena State Park, occurred in 1962. Its name was changed in 1970 at the behest of the local citizenry who thought it appropriate for the park to honor the Ojibwe chieftain known to have hunted and camped in the area. In 2016, Negwegon State Park, Thompson's Harbor State Park, and Rockport State Park were designated as Michigan "dark sky preserves."  The Besser Planetarium (from Alpena) hosts celestial viewing events from time to time at the park.

Activities and amenities
The park offers  of hiking trails, primitive camping sites, canoeing, and hunting. The sand road that cuts through the forest and leads to the entrance of the park may require a 4WD/All-wheel drive vehicle. At the boundary between private/county land and state land, the thin sand two-track road, Sand Hill Wilds Road, becomes a very wide groomed gravel road, Negwegon Park Road.

References

External links
Negwegon State Park Michigan Department of Natural Resources
Negwegon State Park Map Michigan Department of Natural Resources

State parks of Michigan
Protected areas of Alpena County, Michigan
Protected areas of Alcona County, Michigan
Protected areas established in 1962
1962 establishments in Michigan
IUCN Category III